Puti Temple or Bodhi Temple is a Buddhist temple located in Mangshi of Dehong Dai and Jingpo Autonomous Prefecture, Yunnan, China. In Dai language, the temple is called Zangxiang, meaning Temple of Precious Stone. Because of war and natural disasters, the temple has been rebuilt numerous times in the past 300 years.

History
Puti Temple was first built in 1667, in the 6th year of Kangxi period (1661–1722) in the Qing dynasty (1644–1911). The temple was named "Bodhi Temple" by master Dengci. The temple is named Puti (Bodhi) Temple because it has a big Bodhi tree. In the Yongzheng period (1723-1735), Yongzheng Emperor (1678–1735) inscribed a plaque with the Chinese characters "" ( means Buddhism lights illuminate everywhere) and bestowed it on the temple.

In 1942, during the Second Sino-Japanese War, the Japanese air force made an air strike on Mangshi, the temple was devastated by war and a fire consumed the Bodhi tree.

In 1950, the temple was demolished in a fire. From 1953 to 1956, the local people rebuilt the temple. In 1978, the local government renovated the temple.

Architecture

Main Hall
With the wooden-structured roof truss, the main hall has 12 large columns which penetrate through the floor to the beams and form the top frame. The smaller wood columns on both sides support the side room formed by auxiliary beams, making the main hall more spacious. The integrates the hip and gable roof of Han Chinese and stilt wooden style of Dai people, which shows dedicated and unique design.

The niches on both sides of the statue enshrine several dozens of statues of Buddha statues with various shapes. On both sides of the main hall there are two stone legendary animals called Gaduo which shoulder the responsibilities of guarding the main hall.

References

Buddhist temples in Yunnan
Buildings and structures in Mangshi
Tourist attractions in Mangshi
1667 establishments in China
Religious buildings and structures completed in 1667
17th-century Buddhist temples